Baisha is a town of Yangxin County, Huangshi, Hubei, China. , it has one residential community and 38 villages under its administration.

References

Towns in China
Divisions of Yangxin County, Hubei